Koppal is a district headquarters of Koppal district in the Indian state of Karnataka. Koppal is surrounded on three sides by hills. It was known as Kopana Nagara.  The town has historical landmarks such as the Koppal Fort, Gavimath (a religious shrine), and the Male Mallappa Temple. Historically, Koppal was known as Jaina Kashi, meaning the "Kashi" or most sacred place for Jains.  It was so named because there were more than 700 Basadis (also called Bastis), Jain meditation halls or Prarthana Mandirs. Koppal district was carved out of Raichur district, located in the northern part of Karnataka state, on 1 April 1998.

Demographics
As per the 2011 census, Koppal district had a population of 70,698. This gives it a ranking of 350th in India (out of a total of 640). 
Its population growth rate over the decade 2001-2011 was 16.32%. Koppal has a sex ratio of 1006 females for every 1000 males and a literacy rate of 79.97%.

Transport 
Koppal has a railway station, which is located north-west from the city centre, connecting to Delhi,Bengaluru, Hubli, Hyderabad, Tirupati, and Kolhapur. National Highway 63 passes through the city, which connects Ankola and Gooty through Hubli.

Villages

References

External links

Cities and towns in Koppal district
Forts in Karnataka